Baganga, officially the Municipality of Baganga, is a 1st class municipality in the province of Davao Oriental, Philippines. According to the 2020 census, it has a population of 58,714 people, making it the third largest town in province.

It is the largest among the municipalities and city in the province in terms of land area, and is considered the chief town of the province's 1st legislative district.

Etymology
Baganga got its name from a thorny bush having plum like fruits that were abundant during the Spanish arrival. Others say that it was referred to a big mouth of a river that traversed the central part of the town.

History
The Mandaya tribes provided festive receptions to early Spanish explorers and received correspondingly glowing descriptions by those who accounts made it back to Spain. Garcia Descalante Alvarado, chronicling the arrival of the Villalobos Expedition on August 7, 1543, was particularly effusive in praising its beauty to King PhilipII.

Under Spanish rule, Baganga was organized as part of the Encomienda de Bislig together with Cateel, Caraga and Hina-tuan of Surigao under Sargent Mayor Juan Camacho dela Peña. It was a Christian village under the Diocese of Cebu. In 1894 Baganga together with other settlements have its first Spanish priest Fr. Gilbert, a Jesuit.

Baganga officially became a town on October 29, 1903, under Organic Act 21. On its creation it included the barangays of Mahan-ub, Dapnan, Lambajon, San Isidro, Mikit, Campawan, San Victor, Salingcomot, Saoquigue, Baculin, Bobonao, Batawan, Binondo, Ban-ao, Central and Kinablagan. Lucod was the 18th barangay created under Provincial Resolution No. 110.

The destruction made by the Japanese during the World War II in 1941 has created awareness among residents for new development. The restoration of local officials in 1949 opened it as a venue for Agri-base development. Coconut, Abaca and fruit planting were in abundance followed by root crops of various species suitable to the soil.

Geography

Climate
Baganga has a tropical rainforest climate (Af) with heavy to very heavy rainfall year-round.

Barangays

Baganga is politically subdivided into 18 barangays.

Salingcomot

 Carolina lake
 Pilot view beach resort
 Mangrove area under rahabilation of DENR
 Philippines army (67IB Aguila)

Campawan
This barangay is home to a lot of waterfalls, and one of the major attraction of "Campawan" is the so-called "Curtain Falls".

Dapnan
Dapnan is home to many white-sand beaches in Baganga like the famous Agawon Beach. The major industry of this small barangay is the coconut industry.

Tourist spots:
Sunrise Boulevard

Kinablangan
On October 18 Kinablanganion celebrate the Araw Ng Kinablangan (Day of Kinablangan) or the Niyogan Festival. The economic strength is agriculture and fishing.

Schools:
Kinablangan Elementary School
Dr. Beato C. Macayra National High School
POO Elementary School

Tourist spots:
Floating Cottage
Balite Hot Spring (locally called "Mainit")
Punta (Poo Island)
Sandbar, Poo Kinablangan

Mahan-ub
Mahan-ub is derived its name from the river "mahan-ub". This Barangay is located in a remote area, and subdivided into 12 puroks (Olin, Catabuanan II, Banahao, Pagsingitan, Abuyuan, Coog, Mercedez, R. C., Kaputian, Kasunugan, Kati-han II, Bisaya). The present Barangay Chairman is Roy Aguilon Nazareno. Their economic strength is agruculture, producing rice, coconut, abaca, and logs. They celebrate the annual fiesta every June 13 in honor of the patron San Antonio de Padua. They celebrate the Araw ng Mahan-ub every June 11 the Carabao Festival.

Schools:
 R. C. Macayra Elementary School
 Coog Elementary School

Tourist spots:
 Katiquipan Falls

San Victor
San Victor is a small barangay located on San Victor Island. The major sources of income are subsistence farming and fishing. The barangay captain is Ike Fontillas.

School:
 San Victor Elementary School

Saoquigue
Saoquigue is a remote barangay, subdivided into 8 purok's or wards. The present Barangay Chairman is Mr. Balug. The predominant source of income is agriculture (coconut) and fishing, with some shops and marketing businesses buying copra and charcoal from coconut shells.

School:
Saoquigue Elementary School

Demographics

Language

Baganga, as part of Davao Oriental, uses the Southern Kamayo dialect. The Southern Kamayo is quite different from the Kamayo language of Bislig, Surigao Del Sur. Southern Kamayo is also spoken in Southern Lingig, Surigao del Sur, in Cateel, Caraga and some parts of Davao Oriental. It is also related to Surigaonon and Butuanon.

Dialect variations are caused by mixed dialect communications between the Mandaya, Cebuano and other immigrants now living in the area. A suffix is added in most adjectives. Example: The word gamay in Cebuano (English: "small") is gamayay in Baganga. But you can't use the "ay" suffix always with adjectives. For instance, the word dako (English; "big") is spoken as "bagas-AY" or "bagasay" instead of saying "dako-ay". dutayay (English: "very small")

Economy

See also
 Baganga Protected Landscape

References

External links
 Baganga Profile at the DTI Cities and Municipalities Competitive Index
 Official Website
 [ Philippine Standard Geographic Code]
Philippine Census Information
Local Governance Performance Management System

Municipalities of Davao Oriental